Hemidactylus beninensis is a species of gecko. It is endemic to Benin.

References

Hemidactylus
Reptiles described in 2006